Wesley is an unincorporated community in Emanuel County, in the U.S. state of Georgia.

History
A post office called Wesley was established in 1912, and remained in operation until 1950. The community was named after John Wesley (1703–1791), the Anglican cleric and theologian, and founder of Methodism.

The Georgia General Assembly incorporated Wesley as a town in 1913. The town's municipal charter was repealed in 1995.

References

Former municipalities in Georgia (U.S. state)
Unincorporated communities in Georgia (U.S. state)
Unincorporated communities in Emanuel County, Georgia
Populated places disestablished in 1995